The badminton mixed doubles tournament at the 2016 Summer Olympics took place from 11 to 17 August at Riocentro - Pavilion 4. The seeding was decided on 21 July 2016.

Competition format

The tournament started with a group phase round-robin followed by a knockout stage.

Seeds
A total of 4 pairs were given seeds.

 (bronze medalists)
 (quarter-finals)
 (gold medalists)
 (group stage)

Results

Group stage

Group A

Group B

Group C

Group D

Finals

References 

Badminton at the 2016 Summer Olympics
2016
Mixed events at the 2016 Summer Olympics